Rexheb Beqiri (18 August 190110 August 1995), better known by the religious name Baba Rexheb, was an Albanian Islamic scholar and Sufi. He was the founder and the head of the Bektashi Sufi lodge (tekke) located in Taylor, Michigan, United States.

Early life
Baba Rexheb was born as Rexheb Beqiri, on 18 August 1901, into a family with strong Bektashi ties in Gjirokastër, southern Albania, at a time when Albania was still part of the Ottoman Empire. His father, Refat Beqiri, was a local mullah in the old neighbourhood of Dunavat, Gjirokastër. Refat’s family had originally migrated to southern Albania from the Kosovar town of Gjakova. His mother was from Elbasan in central Albania as was his murshid, his spiritual guide, Selim Baba Elbasani. He entered the Bektashi Order at the age of sixteen and was promoted to the rank of dervish at the age of twenty. A year later, he took an additional vow as a mücerred (celibate) dervish. For the next twenty-five years he served in the Asim Baba Tekke, under the guidance of his maternal uncle, Baba Selim. During World War II, Dervish Rexhep followed the guidance of his murshid and went from village to village, telling the people that the communists "Din yok, vatan yok," that is, "They have no religion, they have no homeland." Because of this he was forced to flee in 1944 when the communists under Enver Hoxha came to power. He spent four years in a displaced persons camps in Italy. His dream was to serve Bektashis in America, but after World War II, it was very difficult to come to America. So instead he went to the Bektashi Kaygusuz Sultan Tekke in the Mokattam in Cairo,  Egypt. He stayed there for four years until his number for the United States finally came up. He traveled to New York City where one of his sisters, Zejnep Cuçi, had preceded him.

Bektashi career
In 1954, Baba Rexheb established the First Albanian Bektashi Tekke in Taylor, Michigan (just outside Detroit, Michigan), where there was a group of Albanian Bektashis who supported him.

Baba Rexheb was joined by Baba Bajram, Dervish Arshi, and small number of other Bektashi clerics from Egypt and the Balkans. In the 1960s, Albanian Bektashi immigrants began to arrive the Detroit area from Macedonia and these strengthened the Bektashi community. At this time the Bektashi Teqe was also a working farm with orchards, fields, gardens, animals, and a large hen barn. Bektashis came from Canada and other parts of America to be with Baba. There were always many people at the long kitchen table for the main midday meal of the day. People gathered outside in the garden and many came days early for the holidays.

In 1967, Baba Rexheb began his master work in Albanian, Misticizma Islame dhe Bektashizma (Islamic Mysticism and Bektashism). He published it in 1970. In 2016, the book was fully translated into English by Huseyin Abiva.

Later, Baba Rexheb was asked by Baba Qamil of Gjakova in Kosova to translate into Albanian Fuzuli's "Hadikat-i Su'ada," a classic 16th century work in Ottoman Turkish, parts of which are read aloud at the holiday of Muharrem. Indeed, he was the only one in the world with the depth of Islamic learning and linguistic skills to do this. Baba was fluent in Arabic, Persian, Ottoman Turkish, modern Turkish, Greek, and Italian. He had passed the tests for the ulemma back in Albania, but more important, he had studied Arabic and Persian texts with Selim Baba Elbasani for twenty years. While he was in Egypt, he had also spent time in the Bektashi library reading more of these texts.

Baba Rexheb taught in Turkish an American student, Frances Trix, who learned Albanian, for over 20 years. Frances Trix had performed research for over 30 years with the Detroit Bektashi community and had studied for 25 years with Baba Rexheb. Trix later published a biography of Baba Rexheb in 2009. Baba Rexheb's prayers were also sought by people of all backgrounds.

Baba Rexheb died on August 10, 1995 (Rabi' ul-Awwal 12, 1416 Hijrah). His türbe (mausoleum) is located on the tekke grounds and is open for pilgrims and truth-seekers of all walks.

See also
 History of the Albanian Americans in Metro Detroit
 Islam in Metro Detroit

Bibliography

References

External links
Bektashi Sufi Order
First Albanian Bektashi Tekke in America

1901 births
1995 deaths
People from Gjirokastër
People from Janina vilayet
Albanian Sufis
American Sufis
American Shia Muslims
Albanian emigrants to the United States
Albanian expatriates in Egypt
Bektashi Order